The Value Of Ignorance is a VHS released by singer/songwriter Sinéad O'Connor in 1989. The concert was recorded live at the Dominion Theatre in London, on June 3, 1988. The concert was re-released in 2004 in DVD format as Live: The Year of the Horse/The Value of Ignorance.

Track listing

Credits
Sinéad O'Connor - vocals, guitar

Directed by John Maybury.

References

1989 films
1980s English-language films